Dioxyna sororcula is a species of tephritid or fruit flies in the genus Dioxyna of the family Tephritidae.

Distribution
Europe, Asia, South Africa & Australia. Introduced Hawaii

References

Tephritinae
Diptera of Europe
Diptera of Asia
Diptera of Africa
Insects described in 1830